Lukáš Matějka (born 20 December 1997) is a Czech football player who currently plays for FK Dukla Prague, on loan from Viktoria Plzeň, as a forward.

Club career

Viktoria Plzeň
Since 2017 he is a part of FC Viktoria Plzeň squad. He played his first match for this team on 17 January 2021 against 1. FK Příbram.

Loans at České Budějovice, Ústí, and Domažlice
On 4 January 2017 Matějka was loaned to SK Dynamo České Budějovice in the Czech National Football League. In six months long loan he played in 11 league matches and scored 1 goal. On 1 July 2017 he joined FK Ústí nad Labem of the same league. In his six-month loan he played in 15 league matches, 2 matches in Czech Cup and scored 2 goals. On 25 January 2018 he was loaned to TJ Jiskra Domažlice in Bohemian Football League. In six months long loan he played in 15 league matches and scored 14 goals.

Second loans at Ústí and České Budějovice
On 1 July 2018 he was loaned to Ústí nad Labem for the second time, on a two-year loan. He played a total of 55 league matches, 4 matches in Czech Cup and scored 26 goals. Matějka joined České Budějovice on loan for the second time on 17 August 2020, scoring once in seven league matches during his six-month loan.

International career
Matějka played international football at under-19 level for Czech Republic U19. He played in 3 matches without scoring a goal.

External links
https://repre.fotbal.cz/hrac/hraci/35595
 

1997 births
Living people
Czech footballers
Czech Republic youth international footballers
Association football forwards
Czech First League players
Czech National Football League players
Bohemian Football League players
FC Viktoria Plzeň players
SK Dynamo České Budějovice players
FK Ústí nad Labem players